Hill and Moor is a civil parish in the Wychavon district of Worcestershire, England.  It includes the village Lower Moor and the hamlets of Upper Moor, Hill and Hill Furze.

External links
The Parish of Hill and Moor

Civil parishes in Worcestershire